Orazio Costante Grossoni (Milan, 1867–1952) was an Italian sculptor.

Biography
Grossoni studied at the Brera Academy of Fine Arts in Milan with Raffaele Casnedi and Ambrogio Borghi and worked in the studio of the sculptor Ernesto Bazzaro. He exhibited portraits and genre works at the first three editions of the Milan Triennale, winning the Fumagalli Prize in 1894. He also took part in the major events at the national and international level, including the Turin (1898) and Milan (1906) exhibitions as well as the Universal Exhibition of 1900 in Paris, where he was awarded a silver medal. The funerary sculpture for which he became known and esteemed in the early years of the 20th century includes the Bocconi (1901–14) and Sacchetti (1921) tombs and the Antonio Ascari monument (1928) in the Cimitero Monumentale in Milan. He also produced models for medals and worked for the building commissioners of Milan Cathedral from 1936 to 1939.

References
 Laura Casone, Orazio Costante Grossoni, online catalogue Artgate by Fondazione Cariplo, 2010, CC BY-SA (source for the first revision of this article).

Other projects

1867 births
1952 deaths
20th-century Italian sculptors
20th-century Italian male artists
19th-century Italian sculptors
Italian male sculptors
19th-century Italian male artists